Colin Falck (14 July 1934 — 27 December 2020) was a British literary critic and poet. He was associate professor in modern literature at York College of Pennsylvania.

In 1962 Falck co-founded the influential postwar British poetry magazine The Review with Oxford University schoolmates Ian Hamilton, Michael Fried, and John Fuller. Falck's poetry would later appear in the first issue of Hamilton's magazine The New Review. In January 1985 he set up, and from that date acted as chair of, the Thurlow Road Poetry Workshop. Among the poets to have brought their work to the fortnightly (now monthly) meetings of the group are Hugo Williams, Jo Shapcott, Ruth Padel, Eva Salzman, Adam Thorpe,  Michael Donaghy, Don Paterson, Jane Duran. Kate Clanchy, Greta Stoddart and Vicki Feaver.

His 1989 treatise Myth, Truth and Literature: Towards a True Postmodernism, attempted to re-think the entire foundation of Romantic art criticism since Kant. The first chapter is a sustained polemic against what Falck argued was the nihilism and ontological emptiness of post-modernism and post-structuralist literary theory. The next chapter offers, in opposition to Saussure, a theory of the origin of language based on onomatopoeia. One critic said:He offers a Neo-Romantic, expressivist view influenced by Shelley. His view is not self-expressivist, however, since it denies the epistemological notion of a detached subject and situates the human being in the world in the manner of modern phenomenology...Art, for Falck, gives ontological truth. The book makes constant reference to Kant, Coleridge, Schiller, Shelley, Blake, Keats and Goethe. Author Camille Paglia hailed the book as "reveal[ing] the future of literary criticism."

Falck criticized W. H. Auden's didactic theory of poetry: "Responsible poetry therefore becomes a kind of war-time fruit-cake, with the raisins of escape thinly distributed in a daily bread of parable."

Notes

Bibliography
The Garden in the Evening by Antonio Machado (translator) The Review, Oxford 
Backwards Into the Smoke  
Poems Since 1900: an Anthology of British and American Verse in the Twentieth Century Hamilton, Ian Macdonald and Jane's, UK London 1975    
In This Dark Light London, TNR 1978
"A Defence of Poetry," Journal of Aesthetics and Art Criticism 44.4 (summer 1986): 398. 37.
"Beyond Theory," Essays in Criticism 1986 XXXVI(1):1-10;  1986 Oxford University Press
Selected Poems by Robinson Jeffers: The Centenary Edition Carcanet Press Ltd. United Kingdom 1987  
Edna St. Vincent Millay: Selected Poems: the Centenary Edition Harpercollins 1991  
Memorabilia Stride Publications (March 1992)  
Myth, Truth and Literature: Towards a True Postmodernism Cambridge University Press 1989, (revised & expanded) 1994   
Post-Modern Love: An Unreliable Narration (1997)
American and British Verse in the Twentieth Century: The Poetry that Matters Ashgate, December 2003 
Leni’s Triumph  Shoestring Press (December 2020)

External links
American and British Verse in the Twentieth Century
Myth, Truth and Literature at Google Books
Myth, Truth and Literature at Cambridge University Press
NYT review of Falck's edition of St. Vincent Millay's Selected Poetry
Falck poem "After Christmas"
Falck poem "Midwinter Spring"
Falck poem "Mid-May"

Living people
English literary critics
English male poets
Literary critics of English
1934 births
English male non-fiction writers